The Lone Eagle is a 1927 American silent melodrama directed by Emory Johnson, based on the story by Emilie Johnson, and starring Raymond Keane, Barbara Kent and Nigel Barrie. It was released by Universal Pictures on September 18, 1927.

Plot
During World War I, American pilot Lieutenant William (Billy) Holmes (Raymond Keane) accepts an assignment with the Royal Flying Corps. The unit location is on the Western Front and has seen plenty of action. During Billy's first air battle, he is accused of cowardice.

He meets an attractive French woman named Mimi (Barbara Kent). They start to fall in love, but the cowardice accusation continues to dog Billy. Mimi stirs Billy's emotions, and he becomes determined to prove his mettle in battle.

The unit receives its next flying mission. The group takes to the sky and encounters a squadron of German aircraft. American ace Red McGibbons (Donald Stuart) is one of Billy's best friends. During the dogfight, Red manages to shoot down a German plane, but is also killed.

The pilot of the downed German aircraft turns out to be the brother of the leader of the German squadron. Lebrun (Cuyler Supplee), the squadron leader, is the top German ace of the squadron. He is determined to avenge his brother's death. He challenges the Royal Flying Corps to an aerial fight.

Still thinking of his best friend, Billy accepts the challenge from LeBrun. Mimi tries to dissuade him, but fails. He jumps in the cockpit of his Sopwith Camel, takes off in pursuit of Lebrun. An epic air duel breaks out, and Lebrun shoots down Billy's aircraft. Billy survives, then commandeers another aircraft from his friend Sven Linder (Jack Pennick). He returns to the air and shoots the German ace down.

Billy is a hero and soon the Allies and the Germans sign the Armistice. With the war over, Billy returns to the United States along with his new bride – Mimi.

Cast
 Raymond Keane as Lieutenant William Holmes 
 Barbara Kent as Mimi 
 Nigel Barrie as Captain Richardson 
 Jack Pennick as Sven Linder 
 Oskar Marion as Captain W.Buehl
 Wilson Benge as Truck Driver
 Donald Stuart as Red McGibbons 
 Cuyler Supplee as Lebrun 
 Frank Camphill as Lieutenant at Desk 
 Marcella Daly as Nannette 
 Eugene Pouyet as Innkeeper 
 Brent Overstreet as Aviator 
 Egbert Cook as Aviator

Production
The credits of The Lone Eagle claim that Emilie Johnson only “assisted” in the screenwriting.

Principal photography took place on location at a small airport near San Diego, California.

Reception
Aviation film historian James Farmer in Celluloid Wings: The Impact of Movies on Aviation (1984) noted, despite the film's tagline:
Greatest of all airplane stories taken from the great war. . .The Lone Eagle was a cheaply produced World War I air drama.

Preservation status
A report created by film historian and archivist David Pierce for the Library of Congress claims:
75% of original silent-era films have perished.
14% of the 10,919 silent films released by major studios exist in their original 35mm or other formats.
11% survive in full-length foreign versions or on film formats of lesser image quality. Many silent-era films did not survive for a multitude of reasons.

Emory Johnson directed 13 films - 11 were silent, and 2 were Talkies.The Lone Eagle was the second film in Emory Johnson's eight-picture contract with Universal. The film's original length is listed at 6 reels.
According to the Library of Congress website, this film has the status of - No holdings located in archives; thus, it is presumed all copies of this film are lost.

Gallery

References

Bibliography

External links
 

1927 adventure films
1920s romance films
1920s war films
1927 films
1927 drama films
American action adventure films
American adventure films
American aviation films
American black-and-white films
American romance films
American romantic drama films
American silent feature films
American war films
1920s English-language films
Film Booking Offices of America films
Films set in France
Melodrama films
Lost American films
Universal Pictures films
American World War I films
1927 lost films
Films directed by Emory Johnson
1920s American films
Silent romantic drama films
Silent adventure films
Silent American drama films